Uh Huh may refer to:

Music
Uh Huh (The Jazz Crusaders album), 1967
Uh-huh, a 1983 album by John Mellencamp
"Uh Huh" (B2K song), 2001
Uh Huh! (EP), a 2009 EP by Queen's Band
"Uh Huh" (Royal Republic song), 2016
"Uh Huh" (Julia Michaels song), 2017

Other uses
"Uh-huh", a colloquial form of yes 
Uh-Huh, an Our Gang character played by John Collum